The 2020–21 Ohio State Buckeyes men's ice hockey season was the 58th season of play for the program and the 8th season in the Big Ten Conference. The Buckeyes represented the Ohio State University and were coached by Steve Rohlik, in his 8th season.

Season
As a result of the ongoing COVID-19 pandemic the entire college ice hockey season was delayed. Because the NCAA had previously announced that all winter sports athletes would retain whatever eligibility they possessed through at least the following year, none of Ohio State's players would lose a season of play. However, the NCAA also approved a change in its transfer regulations that would allow players to transfer and play immediately rather than having to sit out a season, as the rules previously required.

Ohio State had a rather bad season. The team started with middling performances and got progressively worse as the season went along. The Buckeyes' offense was hampered by the loss of their top two scorers from the year before (through graduation) but their defense was just as poor if not worse. OSU was shut out 8 times during the season and, despite some impressive performances, averaged less than two goals per game. The team allowed an average of 3.72 goals against (only three teams averaged worse) nearly a goal and a half more than they had the year before. With both their offense and defense heading in the wrong direction, Ohio State finished with its worst record in 26 years. The team somehow managed not to finish last in the Big Ten but, after being shutout by Michigan in the conference quarterfinals, that was little consolation.

Departures

Recruiting

Roster
As of September 17, 2020.

Standings

Schedule and Results

|-
!colspan=12 style=";" | Regular Season

|-
!colspan=12 style=";" |

Scoring statistics

Goaltending statistics

Rankings

USCHO did not release a poll in week 20.

References

External links

Ohio State Buckeyes men's ice hockey seasons
Ohio State Buckeyes
Ohio State Buckeyes
Ohio State Buckeyes
Ohio State Buckeyes
Ohio State Buckeyes